William Osael Romero Castillo (born 18 April 1986) is a Salvadoran former footballer. He was banned for life in 2013, for match fixing while playing for the El Salvador national football team.

Career

Club
Romero started his career at Atlético Chaparratique before joining Vista Hermosa in 2006.

On 1 February 2010, Chivas USA signed El Salvador international from FC Dallas who held a discovery claim on the player, the 23-year-old midfielder arrived in Los Angeles and comes on loan from Vista Hermosa. On 26 June 2010, Romero scored his first MLS goal with Chivas USA in a game against FC Dallas at The Home Depot Center, in which ended 1–2 in favor of FC Dallas.

He returned to his home country to join Águila for the 2010 Apertura.

International
Romero officially received his first cap on 13 October 2007 in a friendly match against Costa Rica. He scored his first goal for the national team on 22 October 2008 in a friendly match against Bolivia. Arguably, Romero's greatest moment to date as a Salvadoran international came on 11 February 2009 in a World Cup qualification match against Trinidad and Tobago when he scored two late goals from free kicks in the dying moments of the game to even the scores and save El Salvador from a disappointing home loss. The game ended at 2–2. During the 2009 Gold Cup, Romero scored two goals against Costa Rica that gave El Salvador a victory over traditional rivals Costa Rica.

As of February 2012, he has represented his country in 19 FIFA World Cup qualification matches and played at the 2009 and 2011 UNCAF Nations Cups as well as at the 2009 and 2011 CONCACAF Gold Cups.

On 20 September 2013, Romero was one of 14 Salvadoran players banned for life due to their involvement with match fixing.

International goals

Awards

Individual achievement

References

External links
 Profile – El Gráfico 
 
 Player profile – Gold Cup 2009
 

1986 births
Living people
People from Usulután Department
Association football midfielders
Salvadoran footballers
El Salvador international footballers
2009 UNCAF Nations Cup players
2009 CONCACAF Gold Cup players
2011 Copa Centroamericana players
2011 CONCACAF Gold Cup players
2013 CONCACAF Gold Cup players
C.D. Vista Hermosa footballers
Chivas USA players
C.D. Águila footballers
Salvadoran expatriate footballers
Expatriate soccer players in the United States
Major League Soccer players
Sportspeople involved in betting scandals
Sportspeople banned for life